Haytla    is a town in Akkar Governorate, Lebanon.

The population  is mostly Greek Orthodox and Alawite.

History
In 1838, Eli Smith noted  the village as Heitela,  located east of esh-Sheikh Mohammed. The  inhabitants were Alawites and  Greek Orthodox.

In 1856 it was also named Heitela on the map of Northern Palestine/Lebanon that Heinrich Kiepert published that year.

References

Bibliography

External links
Haytla, Localiban 

Populated places in Akkar District
Eastern Orthodox Christian communities in Lebanon